Tricholoma fracticum is a sturdy mushroom of the agaric genus Tricholoma with a red-brown cap and a harshly bitter taste. It is mycorrhizal with conifers, primarily of the genus Pinus, and can be found in California.

Taxonomy
First described as Agaricus fracticus by German mycologist Max Britzelmayr in 1893, it was transferred to the genus Tricholoma in 1984 by Hanns Kreisel. Though it has been occasionally listed as a synonym of Tricholoma batschii, a European species, T. fracticum possesses larger spores and 2-spored basidia in contrast with T. batschii's 4-spored basidia, and they are currently considered separate species.

Description
Tricholoma fracticum is distinguishable with relative ease by noting the combination of a red-brown cap that becomes viscid (slimy) when wet, and a quickly disappearing partial veil that leaves a flimsy ring or sometimes only a delineation in stipe color up towards the gills. No other Tricholoma in California has both of these features. Also worth noting is its sharp, bitter taste, which is always present in this species and distinguishes it from lookalikes such as Tricholoma aurantium, which has a blander, mealy taste. The cap is more or less smooth, with an initially inrolled margin, 3-10cm in diameter, broadly convex and flattening slightly in maturity. Gills are whitish, attached, and notched to subdecurrent. Stem sturdy, 2-8cm long, 1-2.5cm thick, whitish near apex, orange-brown below, with a flimsy but usually present ring. Flesh white, not bruising or changing upon exposure. Odor indistinct. Spore print white.

See also
List of North American Tricholoma
List of Tricholoma species

References

fracticum
Fungi described in 1893
Fungi of Europe
Fungi of North America